Rodrigo de Oliveira Ramos (born 24 May 1995), sometimes known as just Rodrigo, is a Brazilian professional footballer who plays as a right back for Juazeirense.

References

External links

Rodrigo Ramos at ZeroZero

1995 births
Living people
Brazilian footballers
Brazilian expatriate footballers
Sportspeople from Bahia
Association football defenders
Brazil under-20 international footballers
Campeonato Brasileiro Série A players
Campeonato Brasileiro Série D players
Major League Soccer players
Coritiba Foot Ball Club players
Maringá Futebol Clube players
Chicago Fire FC players
Sociedade Desportiva Juazeirense players
Esporte Clube Jacuipense players
Botafogo Futebol Clube (PB) players
Juazeiro Social Clube players
Brasiliense Futebol Clube players
Brazilian expatriate sportspeople in the United States
Expatriate soccer players in the United States